Asadollah Badamchian (born 22 December 1942 in Tehran) is an Iranian journalist and conservative and principlist politician who was a member of the parliament for two terms. He is also one of the founders of Islamic Coalition Party, currently serving as the spokesperson for the party. He was also managing-director of Shoma newspaper.

References

External links

1942 births
Living people
Deputies of Tehran, Rey, Shemiranat and Eslamshahr
Islamic Coalition Party politicians
Members of the 2nd Islamic Consultative Assembly
Members of the 8th Islamic Consultative Assembly
Central Council of the Islamic Republican Party members